The 1952 United States presidential election in Alabama took place on November 4, 1952, as part of the 1952 United States presidential election. Alabama voters chose eleven representatives, or electors, to the Electoral College, who voted for president and vice president.  In Alabama, voters voted for electors individually instead of as a slate, as in the other states.

Alabama was won by Adlai Stevenson (D–Illinois), running with Senator John Sparkman, with 64.55% of the popular vote, against Columbia University President Dwight D. Eisenhower (R–New York), running with Senator Richard Nixon, with 35.02% of the popular vote.

1952 marked the last time Montgomery and Jefferson counties would vote Democratic in a presidential election until 1996 and 2008 respectively, as both would become epicenters of the Civil Rights Movement of the 1950s and 1960s.

Results

Results by county

See also
United States presidential elections in Alabama

References

Alabama
1952
1952 Alabama elections